Atlético Limeño(Los Limeñosi) is a Honduran football club that plays its home games at Estadio Milton Flores in La Lima, Cortés. Club manager is Alejandro Cálix.

Football clubs in Honduras